Mike MacWilliam (born February 14, 1967 in Burnaby, British Columbia) is a former professional ice hockey player who grew up playing minor hockey in Burnaby, B.C. and continued on to play in several leagues throughout his career including the WHL, AHL, IHL, and NHL.

MacWilliam played 6 games in the National Hockey League with the New York Islanders in the 1995–96 season.

Career statistics

External links
 

1967 births
Living people
Adirondack Red Wings players
Canadian ice hockey left wingers
Cardiff Devils players
Denver Grizzlies players
Flint Spirits players
Greensboro Monarchs players
Sportspeople from Burnaby
Kamloops Blazers players
Medicine Hat Tigers players
Milwaukee Admirals (IHL) players
New York Islanders players
New Westminster Bruins players
Phoenix Roadrunners (IHL) players
St. John's Maple Leafs players
Tulsa Oilers (1992–present) players
Undrafted National Hockey League players
Utah Grizzlies (IHL) players
Ice hockey people from British Columbia
Sacramento River Rats players
Vancouver VooDoo players
Canadian expatriate ice hockey players in Wales
Canadian expatriate ice hockey players in the United States